Love for Sale: Pop Music in America is a 2016 book by The Nation music critic David Hajdu, in which he chronicles the 100-plus year history of pop music in the United States. The book features previously published material as well as interviews, including an interview with legendary folk singer Dave Van Ronk. Chronologically, Love for Sale takes the reader from the origins of  ragtime in the 19th century through to the present era of streaming music. The author also sequential discusses the rise of tapes, CDs, and MP3s. The title of the book is derived from the 1930 Cole Porter song of the same name.

Love for Sale constitutes Hajdu's attempt to answer the question: “What is the history and meaning of pop music?”

Reception 
The New York Times gave the book a generally favorable review, calling it, "very educational and entertaining". Still, the review cautioned that, "If [the book] were an album, it would be a collection of singles and B-sides meant to hold the fans at bay until the next major release." The Boston Globe described Love for Sale as, "idiosyncratic romp through the history of the American popular music industry." The book was favorably reviewed by the Wall Street Journal, Associated Press and Vanity Fair, among others.

References

External links
David Hajdu Official Site

2016 non-fiction books
American non-fiction books
Books about rock music
Books about pop music
Books of music criticism
Books of interviews
Farrar, Straus and Giroux books